Oscar Heyman & Brothers is an American fine jewellery design and manufacturing firm. The company is known for its expertise in manufacturing and for its use of colored gemstones. The company is known in the jewelry industry as ′The Jewelers’ Jeweler,′ which is the name of the book on the company researched, written, and published by the Museum of Fine Arts, Boston.

History 
Oscar, Nathan, and Harry Heyman founded the company in 1912 in New York City. They were later joined by their three younger brothers, George, William, and Louis, along with two sisters, Frances and Lena. Today, Oscar Heyman is managed by the second and third generations of the family. The current officers of the company are Adam C. Heyman (President), Thomas Heyman (Co-President), and Lewis Heyman (Co-President).

Manufacturing 
Oscar and Nathan learned the art of working in platinum jewelry as apprentices at a workshop in Kharkiv, Ukraine. They emigrated to New York in 1906 and set up their own shop in October 1912 on Maiden Lane. In February 1916, the company was granted its first of six U.S. patents related to jewelry making. The office and manufacturing facilities have remained in New York, and are today on Madison Avenue. The firm employs designers, jewelers, lapidaries, setters, engravers, and a tool and die shop.

The Jewelers’ Jeweler 
At the World’s Fair in 1939, Oscar Heyman made jewelry for 4 of the 5 retailers exhibiting in the House of Jewels, thus earning the company the trade name ‘The Jewelers’ Jeweler.’ In April 2017, the Museum of Fine Arts, Boston published a book on the brand by the same name.

Retail Relationships 
Oscar Heyman & Brothers is a wholesale business, selling through retail stores. Oscar Heyman & Brothers produced jewelry for 20th century retailers such as Black, Starr & Frost, Udall & Ballou, Marcus & Co, J.E. Caldwell & Co, Laykin et Cie, and Shreve, Crump & Low. The firm produced invisibly set jewelry made in New York for Van Cleef & Arpels from 1939 – 2001, up until the time the Richemont Group acquired a majority interest. Oscar Heyman produced jewelry for Tiffany & Co. including American Flag pins, pansy brooches, and guard rings. Oscar Heyman also had a relationship with Cartier, dating to around 1910 when Oscar was hired by Pierre C. Cartier at his newly established New York workshop. Working for Cartier in 1969, Oscar Heyman & Brothers designed and crafted the pear shape diamond necklace for the Taylor- Burton Diamond.

Notable Clients 
Elizabeth Taylor, Nancy Reagan, Evelyn Lauder, Marjorie Merriweather Post, President Jimmy Carter, Frank Lloyd Wright, John Hay Whitney, Benno Charles Schmidt Sr.

Awards 
2017: AGTA Spectrum Awards
2014: PGI-USA’s JCK Platinum Innovation Awards
2002: AGTA Spectrum Awards

References

External links 
1stdibs.com/introspective-magazine/oscar-heyman/ "Oscar Heyman Is the Most Famous Jeweler You've Never Heard Of"
"U.S. High Jeweler Oscar Heyman's Story To Be Told With New Book"
"Heyman Bros, Oscar"
"Romancing the Stones"
"Oscar Heyman is the Latest to get 'Made in NY' Designation"
"The New York City Jewelers to Know Now"
"Rare and Beautiful: Jewelry Generations"
"Selling Emotion to Luxury Consumers"
"How Oscar Heyman became the Jewelers' Jeweler"
"Time Travel with Oscar Heyman"

Jewelry companies of the United States
American companies established in 1912
1912 establishments in New York City
Manufacturing companies based in New York City
American jewelry designers
American jewellers
American brands
Companies based in New York City
Companies based in Manhattan
Privately held companies based in New York City
Luxury brands
Design companies established in 1912